"Bad Day" is a song recorded by American alternative rock band R.E.M. It is one of two previously unreleased songs from their 2003 compilation album, In Time: The Best of R.E.M. 1988–2003, and was released as the album's lead single on September 15, 2003.

An outtake version of the song originally recorded for Lifes Rich Pageant finally appeared on EMI's 2006 compilation And I Feel Fine... The Best of the I.R.S. Years 1982–1987. A demo version from the same sessions appeared on the 25th Anniversary Edition of Lifes Rich Pageant in 2011. The arrangement of the song is slightly different in each version.

Background and composition
"Bad Day" is an anti-media rant which was inspired by a day when Michael Stipe opened his front door and found a camcorder lens in his face. The lyrics also reference the policies of U.S. President Ronald Reagan, as the song was originally written in the 1980s during his administration. Stipe sang a few words of it during a concert in Albany, New York in 1985, as part of the Reconstruction Tour. Around the time of Lifes Rich Pageant, the song emerged in a more polished version with the title "PSA"—an abbreviation for "public service announcement".

The song was never released but did serve as a sort of forerunner to "It's the End of the World as We Know It (And I Feel Fine)", a song with a similar cadence and delivery. In 2003, Stipe saw that the song still had contemporary resonance due to the policies of George W. Bush, and the band finally recorded it for In Time, with only slightly updated lyrics and under the new title "Bad Day". In the liner notes for In Time, Peter Buck wrote: "We started writing this song in 1986 [sic]. We finished writing it in 2003. The sad thing is, between those years nothing much has changed."

Music video
The official music video was directed by Tim Hope and shot in Vancouver in May 2003. It is a parody of cable news and was produced by Passion Pictures. It appears on In View, the DVD companion of In Time, and is also found on the main CD of In Time.

In the video, Stipe appears as the Morning Team's news anchor Cliff Harris; Mike Mills doubles as roving reporter Ed Colbert and meteorologist Rick Jennings; and Buck as climate expert Geoff Sayers and the reporter Eric Nelson. News stories shown include a monsoon contained within an apartment, a senator's office flooding, and a tornado inside a boy's bedroom.

In other media
The song can be heard in a third-season episode of Alias, in the Scrubs episode "My Advice To You", in the 76th episode of Boston Public and in the Smallville episode "Slumber".

The song is included on R.E.M. Live.

Track listings
UK CD1 (Warner W624CD1) (UK)
 "Bad Day" (Berry, Buck, Mills, Stipe)
 "Favorite Writer" (Linda Hopper, Ruthie Morris)
 "Bad Day" (video)

UK CD2 (Warner W624CD2) (UK)
 "Bad Day"
 "Out in the Country" (Paul Williams, Roger Nichols)
 "Adagio" (Buck, Mills, Stipe)

US CD single (Warner 16533–2) (US)
 "Bad Day"
 "Favorite Writer" (Hopper, Morris)
 "Out in the Country" (Williams, Nichols)
 "Adagio" (Buck, Mills, Stipe)

Charts

Release history

References

Songs about the media
R.E.M. songs
2003 singles
Songs written by Bill Berry
Songs written by Peter Buck
Songs written by Mike Mills
Songs written by Michael Stipe
Warner Records singles
Song recordings produced by Michael Stipe
Song recordings produced by Mike Mills
Song recordings produced by Pat McCarthy (record producer)
Song recordings produced by Peter Buck
Patter songs